Nyambi Nyambi (born April 26, 1979) is an American character actor of Nigerian heritage. His most prominent role has been Samuel in the CBS sitcom Mike & Molly.  He has played investigator Jay DiPersia in the Paramount+ legal drama The Good Fight since 2017.

Early life and education
Nyambi was born in Norman, Oklahoma, to Nigerian parents on April 26, 1979.  He attended Oakton High School in Fairfax County, Virginia, and played Division I basketball while attending college at Bucknell University.  After graduating, he earned his Master of Fine Arts in acting at New York University. In 2012 he was also working toward a second master's degree, via an online program in administrative leadership at the University of Oklahoma.

Career
Nyambi took up acting in his senior year at Bucknell, and decided to attend NYU (rather than Yale, where he had also been admitted for graduate school) to pursue his acting interest.  He also attended  the Stella Adler Studio of Acting in New York City.

He had a bit part in the independent film Day Night Day Night as Organizer.  He appeared in the episode "Four Cops Shot" in the final season of Law & Order and in the independent film William Vincent alongside James Franco and Josh Lucas.

Among his stage roles have been Caliban in a 2008 Classic Stage Company production of The Tempest and Alfred in a 2009 production of Athol Fugard's Coming Home at The Wilma Theater in Philadelphia.

His big break came when he was cast in the sitcom Mike & Molly as Samuel, a Senegalese waiter who works at Mike and Carl's favorite restaurant.

In 2017, Nyambi joined The Good Fight in a recurring role as a law firm investigator. For the second season, he was promoted to regular cast member.

in 2018, he voiced J'onn J'onzz/Martian Manhunter in the animated films The Death of Superman and Reign of the Supermen, as well as John Stewart in Lego DC Super-Villains. He also appeared in the 2018 American comedy-drama Blindspotting.

Filmography
Mike & Molly -Samuel 2010-2016

Law & Order-Four Cops Shot 2010

References

External links
 

Living people
1979 births
American people of Nigerian descent
People from Norman, Oklahoma
Bucknell University alumni
Bucknell Bison men's basketball players
American male television actors
Tisch School of the Arts alumni
21st-century American male actors
Male actors from Oklahoma
American men's basketball players
Oakton High School alumni